Acleris similis is a species of moth of the family Tortricidae. It is found in Kazakhstan, China, Japan and Russia.

The wingspan is about 22 mm.

The larvae feed on Spiraea sericea, Spiraea salicifolia, Rosa davuricum and Vaccinium uliginosum.

References

Moths described in 1931
similis
Moths of Asia